.bt is the Internet country code top-level domain (ccTLD) for the Kingdom of Bhutan. It is administered by the Ministry of Information and Communication.

Domains and Subdomains
Domains and Subdomains with registration qualification requirements:

.bt - Organizations or individuals.
.com.bt - Commercial organizations or related individuals.
.edu.bt - Universities and other educational institutes.
.net.bt - Networks.
.gov.bt - Government-related websites only.
.org.bt - Non-profit organizations.

References

External links
 .BT domain name registry
 IANA .bt whois information

Communications in Bhutan
Country code top-level domains
Computer-related introductions in 1997

sv:Toppdomän#B